Andriy Serhiyovych Kravchuk (born 26 February 1999) is a Ukrainian professional footballer who plays for Vorskla Poltava.

Club career
He made his debut in the Ukrainian Premier League for Olimpik Donetsk on 21 October 2018 in a game against Chornomorets Odesa.

He made his debut in the Russian Football National League for Torpedo Moscow on 14 March 2021 in a game against Yenisey Krasnoyarsk.

Following the 2022 Russian invasion of Ukraine, Kravchuk sought refuge in England, and was granted permission to train with Manchester City.

International career
Kravchuk has played for Ukraine at under-17 and under-21 levels.

References

External links
 
 

1999 births
Living people
Ukrainian footballers
Association football midfielders
FC Shakhtar Donetsk players
FC Olimpik Donetsk players
FC Torpedo Moscow players
FC Vorskla Poltava players
Ukrainian Premier League players
Ukraine under-21 international footballers
Ukrainian expatriate footballers
Expatriate footballers in Russia
Ukrainian expatriate sportspeople in Russia
Ukraine youth international footballers
Sportspeople from Chernivtsi